Robert Verrall (born January 13, 1928 in Toronto, Ontario) is a Canadian animator, director and film producer who worked for the National Film Board of Canada (NFB) from 1945 to 1987. Over the course of his career, his films garnered a BAFTA Award, prizes at the Cannes Film Festival and Venice Film Festival, and six Academy Award nominations.

Career
One of the first to join the NFB's fledgling animation unit, under Norman McLaren, Verrall would work as animator on such notable NFB animated shorts as The Romance of Transportation in Canada and produce such shorts as Cosmic Zoom, Hot Stuff as well as the Academy Award-nominees The Drag and What on Earth!. His NFB animation credits as executive producer included The Family That Dwelt Apart and Evolution, also Oscar nominees.

Verrall was named director of English-language NFB animation in 1967, and director of NFB's English-language production overall, in 1972. In the 1980s he acted as executive producer on a number of NFB co-productions, including the film adaption of The Wars, and The Tin Flute. His documentary production credits include Alanis Obomsawin's 1986 Richard Cardinal: Cry from a Diary of a Métis Child. He is the father of David Verrall, who would himself go on to head the NFB's English-language animation unit.

Filmography
The Three Blind Mice - animated short film, George Dunning 1945 - co-animator with George Dunning and Grant Munro
Christmas Carols - short film, Jim MacKay 1947 - co-animator
A Story About Breadmaking in the Year 1255 A.D. - documentary short, 1948 - cinematographer, editor, animator, director
Time and Terrain - documentary short, Colin Low 1948 - co-editor with Colin Low
A Capital Plan - documentary short, Bernard Devlin 1949 - animator
Planning Canada’s National Capital - documentary short, Donald Fraser 1949 - co-animator with Allan Ackman and Gordon Petty
Date of Birth - short film, Donald Fraser 1950 - animator
Ottawa: Today and Tomorrow - documentary short, Bernard Devlin 1951 - animator
Age of the Beaver - documentary short, Colin Low 1952 - co-animator with Sidney Goldsmith
The Romance of Transportation in Canada - documentary short, Colin Low 1952 - co-animator with Wolf Koenig 
The Structure of Unions - documentary short, Morten Parker 1955 - writer
The Colour of Life - documentary short, J.V. Durden 1955 - co-animator with Evelyn Lambart 
The Maple Leaf - documentary short, J.V. Durden 1955 - co-animator with Evelyn Lambart
Grain Handling in Canada - documentary short, Guy L. Coté 1955 - animator
A is for Architecture - documentary short, 1959 - co-director with Gerald Budner 
The St. Lawrence Seaway - documentary short, John Howe and Isobel Kehoe 1959 - animator 
Hors-d'oeuvre - collection, 1960 - co-director and co-animator
Collèges classiques in Quebec - documentary short, Pierre Patry 1961 - co-editor with Arthur Lipsett
The Great Toy Robbery - cartoon, Jeff Hale 1963 - co-producer with Wolf Koenig
Percé on the Rocks - documentary short, Gilles Carle 1964 - animator
The Drag - animated short, Carlos Marchiori 1965 - co-producer with Wolf Koenig
Energy and Matter - documentary short, 1966 - animator, director
Alphabet - animated short, Eli Noyes 1966 - producer
Artificial Lung - documentary short, 1966 - director
What on Earth! - animated short, Les Drew and Kaj Pindal 1966 - co-producer with Wolf Koenig
Kurelek - documentary short, William Pettigrew 1967 - co-producer with Tom Daly
Pikangikum - documentary short, John Gould 1967 - co-producer with John Kemeny
Tax Is Not a Four-Letter Word - cartoon, Michael Mills 1967 - producer
Two Films by Lipsett - experimental, Donald Rennick 1968 - co-producer with Joe Koenig and Mark Slade 
Around Perception - experimental animation, Pierre Hébert 1968 - producer
Boomsville - documentary short, Yvon Mallette 1968 - producer
In a Box - animated short, Eli Noyes 1968 - producer
King Size - animated short, Kaj Pindal 1968 - co-producer with Wolf Koenig
Origami - documentary short, Joan Henson 1968 - producer
Population Explosion - documentary short, Pierre Hébert 1968 - co-producer with Wolf Koenig
Rx for Export - documentary short, Pierre Hébert 1968 - co-producer with Wolf Koenig
Cosmic Zoom - documentary short, 1968 - director, co-producer with Joe Koenig
Little Red Riding Hood - animated short, Rhoda Leyer 1969 - producer
The Cartoon Film - documentary short, William Pettigrew 1969 - co-producer with Wolf Koenig
The Half-Masted Schooner - documentary short, Bruce Mackay 1969 - co-producer with Wolf Koenig
The Sky is Blue - animated short, Rick Raxlen 1969 - producer
To See or Not to See - animated short, Břetislav Pojar 1969 - co-producer with Wolf Koenig
Ashes of Doom - short film, Grant Munro and Don Arioli 1970 - co-producer with Wolf Koenig
Best Friends - short film, Bob Browning 1970 - co-producer with Wolf Koenig
Loops to Learn By - documentary short, Rex Tasker 1970 - co-producer with Dorothy Courtois
Of Many People - documentary short, Stanley Jackson 1970 co-producer with John Spotton
The City: Osaka - animated short, Kaj Pindal 1970 - co-producer with John Kemeny
Doodle Film - animated short, Donald Winkler 1970 - producer
What is Life? - animated short, 1970 - co-producer with Joe Koenig
Where There's Smoke - compilation, 1970 - co-director, executive producer
Christmas at Moose Factory - documentary short, Alanis Obomsawin 1971 - executive producer
Citizen Harold - animated short, Hugh Foulds 1971 - executive producer
Evolution - animated short, Michael Mills 1971 - executive producer
Hot Stuff - animated short, Zlatko Grgić 1971 - co-producer with Wolf Koenig
In a Nutshell - animated short, Les Drew and Michael Mills 1971 - co-producer with Wolf Koenig 
Out of Silence - documentary short, Léonard Forest 1971 - executive producer
Pavilion - documentary short, Donald Rennick 1971 - executive producer
The Men in the Park - animated short, George Geertsen 1971 - producer
The Specialist - animated short, Don Arioli and Boris Kolar 1971 - producer
Percy Saltzman Anti-Smoking Clip - documentary short, Don Arioli and Grant Munro 1971 - producer
180 is Max - documentary short, William Pettigrew 1972 - producer
A Film For Japan - documentary short, Rex Tasker 1972 - producer
Bloodsugar - experimental, Rick Raxlen 1972 - executive producer
Exeter - documentary short, Gerald Budner 1972 - executive producer
Gore Road - documentary short, Sarah Evett 1972 - producer
Hard Rider - documentary short, Josef Reeve 1972 - executive producer
Paul Kane Goes West - documentary short, Gerald Budner 1972 - executive producer
The North Wind and the Sun: A Fable by Aesop - cartoon, Rhoda Leyer and Les Drew 1972 - producer
The Underground Movie - animated short, Les Drew 1972 - executive producer
Tilt - animated short, Don Arioli 1972 - executive producer
11 Steps to Survival - animated demonstration, Pierre L'Amare 1973 - co-producer with Pierre L’Amare
General Health - documentary short, Břetislav Pojar, Don Arioli and Grant Munro 1973 - producer
Nutrition - documentary short, Břetislav Pojar, Don Arioli and Grant Munro 1973 - producer
The Twitch - animated short, Al Sens 1973 - co-executive producer with Peter Jones
Tickets s.v.p. - animated short, Pierre Perrault 1973 - executive producer
Valley of the Moon - animated short, Ron Webber 1973 - producer
The Family That Dwelt Apart - cartoon, Yvon Mallette 1973 - executive producer
Man: The Polluter - animated documentary, Don Arioli, Hugh Foulds, Chuck Jones, Wolf Koenig, Kaj Pindal, Frank Nissen, Pino van Lamsweerde, Milan Blažeković, Zlatko Bourek, Dragič Dragic, Boris Kolar, Aleksandar Marks, Vladimir Jutrisa, Dušan Vukotić and Ante Zaninovic 1973 - executive producer
Propaganda Message - animated short, Barrie Nelson 1974 - executive producer
Goldwood - documentary short, Kathleen Shannon 1974 - executive producer 
The Bear's Christmas - short film, Hugh Foulds 1974 - co-executive producer with Peter Jones
Face of the Earth - documentary short, Bill Mason 1975 - executive producer 
No Apple for Johnny - animated short, John Weldon 1977 - executive producer
Canada Vignettes: Fashion Designer - documentary short, Rosemarie Shapley and Judith Potterton 1977 - executive producer
Canada Vignettes: Physiotherapist - documentary short, Rosemarie Shapley and Judith Potterton 1977 - executive producer
Canada Vignettes: Bells and Brass - documentary short, Rick Butler 1978 - executive producer
Canada Vignettes: Bill Miner - documentary short, Peter Jones 1978 - executive producer
Canada Vignettes: Captain Cook - documentary short, Barry Helmer 1978 - executive producer
Canada Vignettes: Crossing Guards - documentary short, Kris Paterson 1978 - executive producer
Canada Vignettes: Faces - animated short, Paul Bochner 1978 - executive producer
Canada Vignettes: Home of the Beaver - documentary short, Ron Webber 1978 - executive producer
Canada Vignettes: Hudden and Dudden and Donald O'Neary: An Irish Folktale - animated short, Eva Szasz 1978 - co-executive producer with Floyd Elliott
Canada Vignettes: Land of the Maple Leaf - documentary short, Ron Webber 1978 - co-executive producer with Floyd Elliott
Canada Vignettes: Les nigogeux - documentary short, Robert Haché 1978 - co-producer with Paul-Eugène LeBlanc
Canada Vignettes: Logger - documentary short, Al Sens 1978 - executive producer
Canada Vignettes: Onions and Garlic: A Hebrew Fable - animated short film, Eva Szasz 1978 - co-executive producer with Floyd Elliott
Canada Vignettes: Stunt Family - documentary short, Lois Siegel 1978 - co-executive producer with Kathleen Shannon
Canada Vignettes: The Ballet Master - documentary short, Rosemarie Shapley and Judith Potterton 1978 - executive producer
Canada Vignettes: The Dentist - documentary short, Rosemarie Shapley and Judith Potterton 1978 - executive producer
Canada Vignettes: The Violin Maker - documentary short, Rosemarie Shapley and Judith Potterton 1978 - executive producer 
Canada Vignettes: The Photographers - documentary short, Rosemarie Shapley and Judith Potterton 1978 - executive producer 
Canada Vignettes: Veterinarian - documentary short, Rosemarie Shapley and Judith Potterton 1978 - executive producer 
Canada Vignettes: The Ham - documentary short, Ronald Blumer 1978 - executive producer
Canada Vignettes: The Veteran - documentary short, Ronald Blumer 1978 - executive producer
Canada Vignettes: The Maple Leaf - animated short, Paul Bochner 1978 - executive producer
Canada Vignettes: The Performer - documentary short, Norma Bailey 1978 - executive producer
Canada Vignettes: Toronto - documentary short, Carlos Marchiori 1978 - executive producer
Canada Vignettes: Wild Rice Harvest Kenora - documentary short, Alanis Obomsawin 1978 - executive producer
Canada Vignettes: Winter - Dressing Up - short film, Gerald Potterton 1978 - executive producer
Canada Vignettes: Winter - Starting the Car - short film, Gerald Potterton 1978 - executive producer
Oh Canada - animated short, Barrie Nelson 1978 - co-producer with Dorothy Courtois, Roman Kroitor, Wolf Koenig
Going the Distance - documentary, Paul Cowan 1979 - co-executive producer with Jacques Bobet
Canada Vignettes: Full Circle - documentary short, Rudi Wrench 1979 - executive producer
Canada Vignettes: Helen Law - documentary short, Jennifer Hodge de Silva 1979 - executive producer
Canada Vignettes: La mer enligne nos terres - documentary short, Phil Comeau 1979 - executive producer
Canada Vignettes: Ma Chère Albertine - documentary short, Suzanne Olivier 1979 - executive producer
Canada Vignettes: Wooly Mammoth - documentary short, 1979 - co-producer with Peter Jones
Canada Vignettes: Wop May - documentary short, Blake James 1979 - co-executive producer with Floyd Elliott
Canada Vignettes: June in Povungnituk - Quebec Arctic - documentary short, Alanis Obomsawin 1980 - executive producer
Latitude 55° - feature, John Juliani 1980 - co-executive producer with Fil Fraser
A Choice of Two - short film, John Howe 1981 - executive producer
A Right to Refuse? - short film, Clayton Bailey 1981 - executive producer
Arthritis: A Dialogue with Pain - documentary, Susan Huycke 1981 - co-executive producer with Roman Kroitor
Ten Million Books: An Introduction to Farley Mowat - documentary short, Andy Thomson 1981 - executive producer
The Man Who Discovered America - documentary short, Ralph Maud 1981 - executive producer
24,213,000... Impressions of the Federal Cultural Review Committee Hearings 1981, 1982 - documentary, Susan Huycke 1982 - executive producer
An Equal Opportunity - short film, Caroline Leaf 1982 - executive producer
End Game in Paris - short film, Veronika Soul 1982 - executive producer
The Way It Is - short film, Beverly Shaffer 1982 - co-executive producer with Kathleen Shannon
Military Ceremonial: An Introduction - documentary short, Dennis Sawyer 1982 - executive producer
Next Generation - documentary short, Stephen Low 1982 - executive producer
One Out of Three is a Fishboat - documentary short, Andy Thomson 1982 - executive producer
The Chemistry of Fire - documentary short, Andy Thomson 1982 - executive producer
What Do We Do Now? - documentary short, Andy Thomson 1982 - executive producer
The Wars - feature, Robin Phillips 1982 - executive producer
Excuse Me, But There's a Computer Asking for You - documentary short, John Howe 1983 - executive producer
Laughter in my Soul - documentary short, Halya Kuchmij 1983 - executive producer with Roman Kroitor
So You're Going to Buy a Boat - documentary short, Andy Thomson 1983 - executive producer
The Tin Flute - feature, Claude Fournier 1983 - co-executive producer with Marie-José Raymond
All the Years - short film, Don McBrearty 1984 - co-executive producer with Michael MacMillan
One’s a Heifer - short film, Anne Wheeler 1984 - executive producer
Democracy on Trial: The Morgentaler Affair - documentary, Paul Cowan 1984 - co-executive producer with Andy Thomson
Incident at Restigouche - documentary, Alanis Obomsawin 1984 - co-executive producer with Adam Symansky
John Cat - documentary short, Wolf Koenig 1984 - co-executive producer with Michael MacMillan
Starbreaker - short film, Bruce Mackay 1984 - co-executive producer with Roman Kroitor 
A Good Tree - short film, Giles Walker 1984 - co-executive producer with Michael MacMillan
Bambinger - short film, Douglas Jackson 1984 - co-executive producer with Michael MacMillan
The Painted Door - short film, Bruce Pittman 1984 - co-executive producer with Michael MacMillan
The Masculine Mystique - feature, John N. Smith and Giles Walker 1984 - co-executive producer with Andy Thomson
Unfinished Business - feature, Don Owen 1984 - co-executive producer with Don Haig and Douglas Dales
River Journey - documentary short, IMAX, John N. Smith 1984 - executive producer
Cages - short film, Michael J. F. Scott 1984 - co-executive producer with Michael MacMillan
The Cap - short film, Robert Duncan 1984 - co-executive producer with Michael MacMillan
Bayo - feature, Mort Ransen 1984 - co-executive producer with Andy Thomson
Richard Cardinal: Cry from a Diary of a Métis Child - documentary short, Alanis Obomsawin 1986 - co-producer with Alanis Obomsawin and Marrin Canell
Poundmaker's Lodge: A Healing Place - documentary short, Alanis Obomsawin 1987 - co-producer with Alanis Obomsawin and Marrin Canell
Professor Norman Cornett: "Since when do we divorce the right answer from an honest answer? - documentary, Alanis Obomsawin 2009 - co-producer with Adam Symansky

Awards

A is for Architecture (1960) 
 Yorkton Film Festival, Yorkton, Saskatchewan: Golden Sheaf Award, First Prize, 1960
 12th Canadian Film Awards, Toronto: Genie Award for Best Film, General Information, 1960
 Columbus International Film & Animation Festival, Columbus, Ohio: Chris Award, First Prize, 1962
 Ibero-American-Filipino Documentary Film Contest, Bilbao, Spain: Special CIDALC Prize, Silver Medal, 1960
 International Exhibition of Electronics, Nuclear Energy, Radio, Television and Cinema, Trieste, Italy: Silver Cup, 1960
 Rapallo International Film Festival, Rapallo, Italy: Third Prize - Silver Cup and Medal, 1960
 Yorkton Film Festival, Yorkton, Saskatchewan: Certificate of Merit, 1960

Hors-d'oeuvre (1960)  
 13th Canadian Film Awards: Award of Merit, Sales and Promotion, 1961

The Great Toy Robbery (1963) 
 Cork International Film Festival, Cork, Ireland: First Prize - Statuette of St. Finbarr, Animated Film and Cartoon 1963
 Belgrade Documentary and Short Film Festival, Belgrade: Diploma of Merit, 1964
 Landers Associates Annual Awards, Los Angeles: Award of Merit, 1969

The Drag (1965)
 Calvin Workshop Awards, Kansas City, Missouri: Notable Film Award, 1966
 Columbus International Film & Animation Festival, Columbus, Ohio: Chris Certificate, 1967
 International Festival of Red Cross and Health Films, Varna, Bulgaria: Silver Medal, 1969
 39th Academy Awards, Los Angeles: Nominee: Best Short Subject, Cartoons, 1967

What on Earth! (1966)
 International Science Fiction Film Festival, Trieste: Silver Seal of the City of Trieste, 1967
 Salerno Film Festival, Salerno: Minister of Entertainment Cup, 1970
 American Film and Video Festival, New York: Blue Ribbon, 1971
 40th Academy Awards, Los Angeles: Nominee: Best Short Subject, Cartoons, 1968

Alphabet (1966) 
 International Festival of Documentary and Short Film of Bilbao, Bilbao: Special Prize of the Ministry of National Education, 1968
 La Plata International Children's Film Festival, La Plata, Argentina: Silver Medal 1968
 Annecy International Animated Film Festival, Annecy: Special Jury Prize, 1967

Energy and Matter (1966)
 21st British Academy Film Awards: BAFTA Award for Best Specialised Film, 1968
 International Festival of Didactic Films, Beirut: Gold Medal, 1980
 Roshd International Film Festival, Tehran: Golden Book Trophy - Category: Primary School Film Group, 1993
 Cork International Film Festival, Cork, Ireland: Certificate of Merit, Scientific and Educational Film, 1966

Around Perception (1968)
 International Exhibition of Scientific Film, Buenos Aires: Silver Medal, 1970
 Vancouver International Film Festival, Vancouver: Certificate of Merit, 1969

Cosmic Zoom (1968)
 Ibero-American Documentary Film. Festival, Bilbao: Gold Medal, 1969
 Trieste Science+Fiction Festival, Trieste: Golden Seal of the City of Trieste, 1969
 International Educational Film Festival, Tehran: Certificate of Merit, Scientific Films, 1969
 International Exhibition of Scientific Film, Buenos Aires: Diploma of Honor, 1970
 International Festival of Short Films, Philadelphia: Award for Exceptional Merit, 1970
 UNIATEC International Technical Film Competition, Berlin: Award of Excellence 1972

Boomsville(1968) 
 Israeli Film Festival, Tel Aviv: Certificate of Merit, 1969

King Size (1968) 
 International Festival of Documentary and Short Film of Bilbao, Bilbao: Silver Medal, 1969
 International Festival of Documentary and Short Film of Bilbao, Bilbao: Diploma of Honour, 1969

Population Explosion (1968) 
 Columbus International Film & Animation Festival, Columbus, Ohio: Chris Certificate, education, 1968
 International Exhibition of Scientific Film, Buenos Aires: Second Prize, Information, 1969

To See or Not to See (1969)
 Berlin International Film Festival, Berlin: Golden Bear for Best Short Film, 1969
 Chicago International Film Festival, Chicago: Certificate of Merit, 1969 
 International Cinematography Congress, Colour Film Week, Barcelona: Diploma of Honour, 1969
 22nd Canadian Film Awards, Toronto: Film of the Year, 1970
 22nd Canadian Film Awards, Toronto: Best Animated Film, 1970
 International Film Festival in Guadalajara, Guadalajara: Award for Animation, 1971
 American Film and Video Festival, New York: Blue Ribbon, 1971
 SODRE International Festival of Documentary and Experimental Films, Montevideo, Uruguay: First Prize, Experimental, 1971

Little Red Riding Hood (1969) 
 Venice Film Festival, Venice: Silver Medal, 1969

Ashes of Doom (1970)
 International Festival of Short Films, Philadelphia: Award for Exceptional Merit, 1971

Doodle Film (1970) 
 Chicago International Film Festival, Chicago: Certificate of Outstanding Merit, 1971 
 Atlanta Film Festival: Silver Medal, Harmony of Man, 1972

What is Life? (1970)
 Columbus International Film & Animation Festival, Columbus, Ohio: Chris Award, First Prize, 1972

Evolution (1971)
 23rd Canadian Film Awards, Toronto: Best Animated Film, 1971
 44th Academy Awards, Los Angeles: Nominee: Best Animated Film, Short Subject, 1972

Citizen Harold (1971) 
 U.S. International Animation Film Festival, New York: Certificate of Merit, Education, 1972
 Columbus International Film & Animation Festival, Columbus, Ohio: Bronze Plaque, 1973
 Melbourne Film Festival, Melbourne: Diploma of Merit, 1973

Hot Stuff (1971)
 International Animation Film Festival, New York: Grand Prix - Silver Praxinoscope, Educational, 1972
 World Festival of Animated Films, Zagreb: Best Educational Film, 1972
 Atlanta Film Festival: Gold Medal, Safety, 1972
 Melbourne Film Festival, Melbourne: Diploma of Merit, 1972
 International Short Film Festival Oberhausen, Oberhausen, Germany: Diploma of the International Council of Graphic Design Associations, 1972
 National Committee on Films for Safety, Chicago: Bronze Plaque, 1972

In a Nutshell (1971)
 Festival of Agricultural & Rural Films/Santarém International Film Festival, Santarém, Portugal: Silver Trophy, 1972

The Men in the Park (1971)
 International Film Festival in Guadalajara, Guadalajara: Second Award, 1972

Hard Rider (1972) 
 American Film and Video Festival, New York: Red Ribbon, 1974

180 is Max (1972) 
 International Review of Cinema and Television Films on Flying, Milan: Diploma and Plaque, 1974

Tilt (1972)
 Annual Conference of the American Institute of Planners, Atlanta: Special Award of Excellence, 1973
 Columbus International Film & Animation Festival, Columbus, Ohio: Bronze Plaque, 1975

The Underground Movie (1972)
 Adelaide Film Festival Youth, Adelaide: Certificate of Merit, 1974

The Family That Dwelt Apart (1973)
 Chicago International Film Festival, Chicago: Silver Hugo, 1973
 25th Canadian Film Awards, Montreal:  Best Animated Film, 1973
 47th Academy Awards, Los Angeles: Nominee: Best Animated Short Film, 1975

The Twitch (1973)
 Melbourne Film Festival, Melbourne: Diploma of Merit, Animation, 1976

Face of the Earth (1975) 
 American Film and Video Festival, New York: Blue Ribbon, High Curriculum Films: Science, 1977
 American Instructional Film Festival, Cleveland: Certificate of Recognition, Clarity and Correlation to Curriculum Area, 1980

Canada Vignettes: Faces (1978) 
 Columbus International Film & Animation Festival, Columbus, Ohio: Bronze Plaque, 1984
 American Film and Video Festival, New York: Red Ribbon, Visual Essays, 1984
 U.S. International Film and Video Festival, Redondo Beach, California: Gold Camera Award, 1984

Canada Vignettes: The Performer (1978) 
 33rd Cannes Film Festival, Cannes: Jury Prize, 1980

Going the Distance (1979)
 C.I.D.A.L.C. International Festival of Sports Films, Torino: First Prize, Gold Plaque, 1982
 Commonwealth Television and Film Festival, Nicosia: Best Film of the Festival, 1980
 52nd Academy Awards, Los Angeles: Nominee: Best Documentary Feature, 1980

A Right to Refuse? (1981) 
 American Film and Video Festival, New York: Red Ribbon, Business and Industry, 1983

The Way It Is (1982)
 Learning A-V Magazine – Award for Outstanding Educational Film, 1984
 National Council on Family Relations Conference, Minneapolis: Honorable Mention, 1984

One Out of Three is a Fishboat (1982) 
 National Committee on Films for Safety, Chicago: Certificate of Merit, 1983

Democracy on Trial: The Morgentaler Affair (1984) 
 Prix Europa, Berlin: Futura Berlin Award, Documentary Film, 1987

A Good Tree (1984) 
 Chicago International Film Festival, Chicago: Silver Hugo Award, Short Subject, Drama, 1984 
 Chicago International Children's Film Festival, Chicago: First Prize, Live Action Under 30 Minutes, 1986
 15th ACTRA Awards, Toronto: Nellie Award for Best Children’s Television Program, 1986

The Masculine Mystique (1984)
 American Film and Video Festival, New York: Red Ribbon, Contemporary Concerns, Feature, 1985

The Painted Door (1984)
 Yorkton Film Festival, Yorkton, Saskatchewan: Golden Sheaf Award, Best Drama Under 30 Minutes, 1985
 Columbus International Film & Animation Festival, Columbus, Ohio: Chris Award, Arts and Culture, 1986
 57th Academy Awards, Los Angeles: Nominee: Best Live Action Short Film, 1984

Richard Cardinal: Cry from a Diary of a Métis Child (1986)
 American Indian Film Festival, San Francisco: First Prize, Best Documentary, 1986
 American Film and Video Festival, New York: Red Ribbon, Current Concerns, 1988
 National Educational Film and Video Festival, Oakland, California: Crystal Apple, Human Relations, Teen Suicide, 1989
 Pärnu International Documentary and Anthropology Film Festival, Pärnu: Special Award, Educational Visual Anthropology of Children and Youth 1991

Poundmaker's Lodge: A Healing Place (1987)
 Columbus International Film & Animation Festival, Columbus, Ohio: Honorable Mention - Category: Health and Medicine / Addiction, Alcohol, Drugs and Tobacco, 1988
 National Educational Film and Video Festival, Oakland, California: Bronze Apple, Health/Drug and Alcohol Addiction, 1991

References

External links

Making Movie History: Robert Verrall, Video interview, 5 min., NFB

1928 births
People from Toronto
Canadian animated film directors
Canadian animated film producers
National Film Board of Canada people
Living people